Michel Reiss (23 July 1805 in Frankfurt – 27 January 1869 in Frankfurt) was a German mathematician who introduced the Reiss relation.

References

 Biography  in Allgemeine Deutsche Biographie (Wikisource copy)

1805 births
1869 deaths
19th-century German mathematicians